The Pashalik of Timbuktu was a West African political entity that existed between the 16th and the 19th century. It was formed after the Battle of Tondibi, when a military expedition sent by Saadian sultan Ahmad al-Mansur of Morocco defeated the Songhai Empire and established control over a territory centered on Timbuktu. Following the decline of the Saadian Sultanate in the early 16th century, Morocco retained only nominal control of the Pashalik.

History
By the end of the 16th century, Moroccan sultans were strengthened after the completion of the reunification of Morocco and the victory over the Portuguese at the Battle of the Three Kings, but their financial needs lead them to extend their realm southward to Saharan gold mines and Songhay territories.

In 1577, a Moroccan expedition occupied Taghaza. In 1582, a first expedition to Timbuktu was defeated.

In 1591, a Moroccan force which left Marrakesh with between three and four thousand soldiers, together with several hundred auxiliaries defeated the Songhai army at Tondibi and conquered Gao, Timbuktu and Djenné. The Pashalik of Timbuktu was then established and Timbuktu became its capital.

Starting from 1618, the Pasha, who was then appointed by the Sultan of Morocco, became elected by the Armas. However, while governing the Pashalik as an independent republic, the Armas continued to recognize Moroccan sultans as their leaders. During the civil war that followed the death of Ahmad al-Mansur in Morocco, the Pashalik supported the legitimate Sultan, Zidan al-Nasir, and in 1670 they recognized the Alaouite sultans and pledged allegiance.

By the middle of the eighteenth century, the pashalik was in total eclipse. In about 1770, the Tuareg took possession of Gao, and in 1787 they entered Timbuktu and made the Pashalik their tributary.

References and Bibliography

References

Bibliography
 
 
 N. Levtzion, Chp. III - North-West Africa: from the Maghrib to the fringes of the forest, pp. 142–222
 The pashalik of Timbuktu, pp. 152–158
 Timbuktu, Jenne and Massina under the Arma, pp. 158–164
 The Arma, Songhay and Tuareg, pp. 165–171
 The Bambara states, pp. 171–182
 
 Chp. III - Karidenna, ancêtre historique et figure emblématique (1647–1713), pp. 149–212
 Chp. IV - Les Iwellemmedan au XVIIIe siècle: émergence d'une entité politique, pp. 213–290
 M. Abitbol, Tombouctou et les Arma: de la conquête marocaine du Soudan nigérien en 1591 a l'hégémonie de l'Empire peul du Macina en 1833, Ed. Maisonneuve et Larose, 1979.
 B. Rosenberg, Michel Abitbol, Tombouctou et les Arma. De la conquête marocaine du Soudan nigérien en 1591 à l'hégémonie de l'Empire Peulh du Macina en 1833 (compte rendu), in: Annales. Économies, Sociétés, Civilisations 37(4), 1982, pp. 833–836
 
 M. Abitbol, Chp. XI - The end of the Songhay empire, pp. 300–326
 

Political history of Mali
States and territories disestablished in 1833
History of Africa
States and territories established in 1591
Former monarchies of Africa
Former countries in Africa
Sahelian kingdoms
Timbuktu
Pashalik of Timbuktu
Former republics